ICFAI University, Himachal Pradesh, or by its full name Institute of Chartered Financial Analysts of India University, Himachal Pradesh is a private university located at the HIMUDA Education Hub, near the village Kallujhanda, Solan district, Himachal Pradesh, India. The university was established in 2011 by the Institute of Chartered Financial Analysts of India Trust through the Institute of Chartered Financial Analysts of India University (Establishment and Regulation) Act, 2011. The university offers higher education in the fields of management, science and technology.

Departments
The university comprises two faculties, Faculty of Management Studies and Faculty of Science and Technology.

References

External links

 

Education in Solan district
Universities in Himachal Pradesh
Educational institutions established in 2011
2011 establishments in Himachal Pradesh
Private universities in India